Elections to Daventry District Council took place on Thursday 5 May 2011. One third of the council (13 seats) was up for election. The previous elections produced a majority for the Conservative Party.

Election result

Ward results

2011 English local elections
2011
2010s in Northamptonshire